West Bank Wall graffiti art is street art on the walled sections of the Israeli West Bank barrier, by a wide range of international and Palestinian artists. The graffiti is on the Palestinian side of the wall and primarily expresses anti-wall sentiments.

Description of the graffiti
The graffiti is on the Palestinian side of the wall and primarily expresses anti-wall sentiments.

The graffiti, written in both English and Arabic, includes "flags and fists, slogans and insults, statements of pain and loss", serving as a "visual testimony" to the suffering of Palestinians under the Israeli occupation of the West Bank. The diversity and amount of street art has been described as "initially overwhelming" with "layers upon layers of street art on the Wall" after almost two decades. Most of the graffiti consists of amateur tags without decorations.

In 2017, prevalent text on the wall included "Palestine", "Free Palestine", "Peace", "Love", "Justice", "Hope", "Freedom", "Unity", "Solidarity", "Friendship", "Apartheid Wall", "God is Love", "God Bless Palestine", "Jesus Loves You", John 3:16, "Christmas", and criticism of US presidents and the names of visitors and their countries.

Tourism and reception
The graffiti has become a tourist attraction, particularly around the Bethlehem area, epitomised by The Walled Off Hotel by graffiti artist Banksy. During Banksy's 2005 trip to the West Bank, a Palestinian man acknowledged both the beauty and irony of Banksy's work, telling him: "We don't want this wall to be beautiful. We hate it. Go home."

Artists
Similar to Berlin Wall graffiti art, much of the artwork is unclaimed by artists and remains anonymous. In 2005, Banksy became the first major international artist to add graffiti to the wall; his stencilled Flying Balloon Girl was considered to serve as a form of "transnational and experiential empathy". 

Banksy was followed by many others, including Blu, Ericailcane, FAILE, JR, Know Hope, Paul Insect, Ron English, Sam3, Swoon and Lushsux.

List of known graffiti artists
 Banksy
 FAILE
 Ron English
 Jonathan Kis-Lev
 Blu
 Ericailcane
 JR
 Know Hope
 Paul Insect
 Sam3
 Swoon
 Lushsux

Gallery

See also
 Culture of Palestine

References

Bibliography
 
 
 Larkin, Craig. “JERUSALEM’S SEPARATION WALL AND GLOBAL MESSAGE BOARD: GRAFFITI, MURALS, AND THE ART OF SUMUD.” The Arab Studies Journal, vol. 22, no. 1, 2014, pp. 134–69, http://www.jstor.org/stable/24877902. Accessed 15 May 2022.

Palestinian territories
Graffiti and unauthorised signage
Israeli West Bank barrier